The Solo River (known in Indonesian as Bengawan Solo, with Bengawan being an Old Javanese word for river, and Solo derived from the old name for Surakarta) is the longest river in the Indonesian island of Java, it is approximately 600 km (370 mi) in length.
 
Apart from its importance as a watercourse to the inhabitants and farmlands of the eastern and northern parts of the island, it is a renowned region in paleoanthropology circles. Many discoveries of early hominid remains (dating from 100,00 to 1.5 million years ago) have been made at several sites in its valleys, especially at Sangiran, including that of the first early human fossil found outside of Europe, the so-called "Java Man" skull.

Bengawan Solo was the crash site of Garuda Indonesia Flight 421.

Geography 

It passes through the major city of Surakarta (called Solo by the local inhabitants). An important early tributary to the Solo River is the Dengkeng River, which has its source on Mount Merapi. After passing through Solo, the river flows northward around Mount Lawu, and then turns eastward into East Java in the Ngawi Regency and Ngawi (town)

After Ngawi the river turns northward again, forming the boundary between Blora Regency of Central Java and Bojonegoro regency of East Java. From the town of Cepu in Blora, the river turns eastward and passes through Bojonegoro regency's capital city. From there, it continues eastward through the Lamongan and Gresik Regencies. The last part of the river's basin (roughly starting from Bojonegoro regency) is mostly flat land.

Bengawan Solo's delta is located near the town of Sidayu in Gresik regency. The present delta is redirected by a human made canal. The original delta flowed into the Madura Strait, but in 1890 a 12-km canal was made by the Dutch East Indies authority to redirect the Solo River into Java Sea. This was done to prevent sedimentation of mud from filling the Madura Strait and thereby preventing sea access to the important port city of Surabaya.

The Solo River delta has a huge mud sedimentation flow that deposits 17 million tonnes of mud per year. This sedimentation in the delta form a cape, which has average longitudinal growth of 70 m per year. This delta is known as Ujung Pangkah (Pangkah Cape).

History 

Solo river was part of a massive river system that once existed in Sundaland. This drainage of the river system consisted of a major river in present-day Sumatra and Borneo, such as the Asahan river, Musi river and Kapuas river. The river system disappeared when Sundaland was submerged after sea level rise following the last Ice Age.

The river played important part in Javanese history.  Its drainage basin is an important agricultural area, dominated by rice farming. The river transported fertile volcanic soil downstream, replenishing the soil. It also provided link between Javanese port cities in the northern coast and the rice-growing hinterlands, with shallow vessels transporting rice to the ports to be sold. This rice is Java's main commodity that was traded as part of the Spice trade.

Following acquisition of much of Java by the Dutch colonial governmental, various cash crops was introduced to be planted across the river basin, such as coffee, sugar and cotton. (see Cultivation System).

By the last years of 19th century, river sedimentation in its original delta in Madura Strait started to disrupt vessels traffic in port of Surabaya. The Dutch colonial government decided to divert the river flow away from the shipping lane into Java Sea. They built a canal in the river's delta in 1890s which still alter the river until this day.

In 1891, Dutch paleoanthropologist Eugène Dubois discovered remains (a part of a skull and human like femur bone and tooth) he described as "a species in between humans and apes". He called his finds Pithecanthropus erectus ("ape-human that stands upright") or Java Man. Today, they are classified as Homo erectus ("human that stands upright"). These were the first specimens of early hominid remains to be found outside of Africa or Europe.

Resource management
Brantas River Public Corporation or Perum Jasa Tirta I (PJT1) is responsible for managing the water resources of Brantas and Bengawan Solo river basins in Indonesia. It is a centralised effort to:
 conserve the water resource quality and quantity in the Bengawan Solo and Brantas River basins
 flood control
 manage hydroelectric and other infrastructures along those rivers.

Prior to the centralised management efforts, there were reports of pollution along the Bengawan Solo.

In culture 
"Bengawan Solo", a song composed by Gesang Martohartono in 1940, poetically describes the river and has become famous across Asia.

References

Further reading

 Prabowo, Dibyo, & McConnell, D. J. & Food and Agriculture Organization of the United Nations.  (1993),  Changes and development in Solo Valley farming systems, Indonesia Food and Agriculture Organization of the United Nations, Rome 

 
Rivers of Central Java
Rivers of East Java
Java Sea
Rivers of Indonesia